The New Formalist was a United States-based literary periodical published (since 2001) monthly in electronic form and once a year in print form.  Distributed by The New Formalist Press and edited by Leo Yankevich, it published many of the leading formal poets writing in English today. The magazine ceased publication in 2010.

Published poets included Jared Carter, Keith Holyoak, Alfred Dorn, T. S. Kerrigan, Richard T. Moore, and Frederick Turner.

The New Formalist also publishes The New Formalist E-book Series.

See also
Mezzo Cammin
New Formalism
The Formalist

References

External links
 The New Formalist
 The New Formalist Press

Monthly magazines published in the United States
Online magazines published in the United States
Annual magazines published in the United States
Defunct literary magazines published in the United States
Magazines established in 2001
Magazines disestablished in 2010
Poetry magazines published in the United States